Masters M40 javelin throw world record progression is the progression of world record improvements of the javelin throw M40 division of Masters athletics.  Records must be set in properly conducted, official competitions under the standing IAAF rules unless modified by World Masters Athletics.

The M40 division consists of male athletes who have reached the age of 40 but have not yet reached the age of 45, so exactly from their 40th birthday to the day before their 45th birthday. The M40 division throws an 800 g implement.  These competitors threw their world record performances in Open competition.

Key

References

Masters Athletics Javelin Throw list
All Time Athletics

Masters athletics world record progressions
Javelin